Nafissatou Dia Diouf (born September 11, 1973 in Dakar) is a Senegalese writer in French.

Her father was a diplomat and her mother was a teacher. She attended the Michel de Montaigne University Bordeaux 3, where she studied Applied Foreign Languages in  International Commerce, Marketing and Commercial Law, Business and Commerce. She has also completed postgraduate studies in Industrial Logistics. Five years later, she came back to Senegal.

Prizes
Young French-speaking writer Award, France, 1999 
Francomania Award, Canada, 2000 
Foundation Senghor Award,  Senegal, 2000

Works
 2001 : Retour d'un si long exil 
 2003 : Primeur, poèmes de jeunesse 
 2004 : Le Fabuleux Tour du monde de Raby 
 2005 : Je découvre l'ordinateur 
 2005 : Cytor & Tic Tic naviguent sur la toile 
 2008 : Les petits chercheurs
 2010 : Cirque de Missira et autres nouvelles

External links
 Official website
General information

1973 births
Living people
Senegalese women writers
Senegalese poets
Senegalese women poets